Elizabeth Morales García (born 29 September 1970) is a Mexican politician from the Institutional Revolutionary Party. From 2006 to 2009 she served as Deputy of the LX Legislature of the Mexican Congress representing Veracruz.

References

1970 births
Living people
Politicians from Veracruz
Women members of the Chamber of Deputies (Mexico)
Institutional Revolutionary Party politicians
21st-century Mexican politicians
21st-century Mexican women politicians
Deputies of the LX Legislature of Mexico
Members of the Chamber of Deputies (Mexico) for Veracruz